Deinard is a Jewish surname. Notable people with this name include:

 Ephraim Deinard (1846–1930), American bibliophile
 Samuel Deinard (1873–1921), American rabbi